Tacker is a surname. Notable people with the surname include:

Francine Tacker (born 1946), American actress
Karan Tacker (born 1986), Indian actor

See also
Acker
Hammer tacker
Tackers
Tocker
Tucker (surname)